Andrew David "Bubba" Berenzweig (born August 8, 1977) is an American former professional ice hockey player. He prepped at Loomis Chaffee School and played collegiately at the University of Michigan. He was drafted by the New York Islanders in the 1996 NHL Entry Draft.

Playing career
Berenzweig was traded by the New York Islanders to the Nashville Predators in exchange for a fourth-round selection in the 1999 NHL Entry Draft. He was later traded to the Dallas Stars, who left him unprotected in the 2003 NHL Waiver Draft. Unselected by any teams, Berenzweig cleared waivers and was assigned to the Stars' minor league affiliate Utah Grizzlies. Berenzweig left the Grizzlies without permission and was suspended by the Stars for violating the terms of his contract.

Personal life
Berenzweig is Jewish, and as of 2014, Berenzweig is working for insurance firm The Hylant Group.

Career statistics

Awards and honors

See also
List of select Jewish ice hockey players

References

External links

1977 births
Living people
American men's ice hockey defensemen
Ice hockey players from Illinois
Michigan Wolverines men's ice hockey players
Milwaukee Admirals (IHL) players
Milwaukee Admirals players
Nashville Predators players
New York Islanders draft picks
People from Arlington Heights, Illinois
Utah Grizzlies (AHL) players
Loomis Chaffee School alumni
Jewish ice hockey players
NCAA men's ice hockey national champions